The list of teams and cyclists in the 2008 Vuelta a España contains the professional road bicycle racers who compete at the 2008 Vuelta a España from August 30 to September 21, 2008.

See also 
2008 Vuelta a España
2008 Vuelta a España, Stage 1 to Stage 11
2008 Vuelta a España, Stage 12 to Stage 21

References 

2008
2008 Vuelta a España